The 1999 European Baseball Championship was won by the Netherlands. It was held in Italy.

Standings

European Baseball Championship
European Baseball Championship
1999
1999 in Dutch sport
Baseball at the 2000 Summer Olympics